Touched with Fire: Manic-Depressive Illness and the Artistic Temperament is a book by the American psychologist Kay Redfield Jamison examining the relationship between bipolar disorder and artistic creativity.  It contains extensive case studies of historic writers, artists, and composers assessed as probably having had cyclothymia, major depressive disorder, or manic-depressive/bipolar disorder.

Reception
The book has widely been very favourably received. It has been the basis for scholarship on the topic of the relationship between bipolar disorder and 'artistic temperament'.

Cultural references
The film of the same name, directed and written by Paul Dalio (who is bipolar), 'draws from' the book and the book is a significant feature in its plot.

See also
Creativity and bipolar disorder

Notes

References
Jamison, Kay Redfield (1993): Touched with Fire: Manic-Depressive Illness and the Artistic Temperament, New York, The Free Press. 

Books about creativity
Creativity and mental illness
Books about bipolar disorder